Monterosso Grana is a comune (municipality) in the Province of Cuneo in the Italian region Piedmont, located about  southwest of Turin and about  west of Cuneo.

Monterosso Grana borders the following municipalities: Castelmagno, Demonte, Dronero, Montemale di Cuneo, Pradleves, Rittana, Valgrana, and Valloriate.

References 

 Comuni-Italiani.it :: Monterosso Grana

Cities and towns in Piedmont